Anthony Steven Pike (born March 10, 1986) is a former American football quarterback who played for the Carolina Panthers of the National Football League (NFL). He played college football at Cincinnati and was drafted by the Panthers in the sixth round of the 2010 NFL Draft.

Early years
Born to Steve and Cheri Pike, Tony attended Reading High School, where he was named Cincinnati Division II-III Player of the Year as a senior at football. As a senior, he completed 319 of 531 passes for 4,355 yards and 46 touchdowns, earning first-team all-state honors. Pike also played basketball, helping the Blue Devils win a state title as a junior and reach the regional finals as a senior.

College career
Pike enrolled at University of Cincinnati in January 2005. He was redshirted for the 2005 season.

In 2007, he made his collegiate debut against Southeast Missouri State, Pike finished the night 6-of-9 for 57 yards and a touchdown. In 2008 college football season, Dustin Grutza was the named the team's starting quarterback following Ben Mauk's failure to gain a sixth year of eligibility from the NCAA. In a 52–26 loss to Oklahoma Sooners, a team that would play for the national championship that season, Grutza broke his ankle and was replaced by Pike.

The Bearcats traveled to Akron, Ohio to play the Akron Zips. Against the Zips, Pike broke his arm and was replaced by redshirt freshman Zach Collaros, who led the Bearcats to a 17–15 victory.

After returning as starting quarterback, Cincinnati recovered to beat two top-25 opponents, No. 23 South Florida Bulls and No. 20 West Virginia Mountaineers. Pike led the team to the outright 2008 Big East Championship, and the Bearcats played in their first-ever BCS bowl game, the 2009 Orange Bowl.

He finished the regular season 183-291 passing for 2,168 yards and 18 touchdowns. He completed 63 percent of his passes and finished second in the Big East passing efficiency list with 141.07. Pike was named to the 2008 All-Mayday Team by ESPN college football analyst Mark May. He also was named to the Second-Team All-Big East Team.

Pike enjoyed even more success in 2009. Despite missing three games due to a re-injury of his broken non-throwing arm (when he was again replaced by Collaros), Pike threw for 2,520 yards and 29 touchdowns, including a school-record six touchdowns in a single game against Illinois. Pike threw just six interceptions in 2009, and led the 2009 Bearcats to a 12-0 regular season and second straight outright Big East title. The team finished the regular season at No. 3 in the BCS rankings, and was invited to the 2010 Sugar Bowl.

Statistics

Professional career

Pike was selected by the Carolina Panthers in the sixth round (#204 overall) of the 2010 NFL Draft. He competed with fellow rookie Jimmy Clausen for playing time behind incumbent Matt Moore in 2010.

In week 9 of his rookie season against the New Orleans Saints, Pike made his NFL debut after Clausen (who had replaced an injured Moore earlier in the game) was benched. He was 6-12 for 47 yards and was sacked once. The Panthers lost 34-3 and fell to 1-7. Pike was waived/injured on August 30, 2011, and was given an injury settlement.

Pike had two elbow surgeries, the second in March 2012. In the Spring of 2012, he participated in tryouts for the Cincinnati Bengals. He was not signed and offensive coordinator Jay Gruden commented that "He doesn't have enough confidence in his elbow to zip the ball and let it loose."

Statistics

Source:

Personal life
At the end of his football career, Pike made a move to become a sports broadcaster in Cincinnati. Pike contributes to ESPN 1530 shows and Cincinnati Bearcats football broadcasts.

References

External links
Cincinnati Bearcats bio

1986 births
Living people
Players of American football from Cincinnati
American football quarterbacks
Cincinnati Bearcats football players
Carolina Panthers players